Amélie Beyries, professionally known as Beyries, is a Canadian folk-pop singer and songwriter from Montreal, Quebec. Her debut album, Landing, was released in 2017 and her sophomore album, Encounter, in 2020.

Biography
Beyries was born and raised in the Montreal neighborhood of Outremont. She worked in public relations until age 28 when she was diagnosed with breast cancer. While undergoing treatment, she began writing songs to deal with her emotions, and eventually worked with producer Alex McMahon to complete her first album.

On February 24, 2017, Beyries released her debut studio album, Landing. Although Beyries is francophone, the album is predominantly in English, except for the song "J'aurai cent ans", a duet with Louis-Jean Cormier which was co-written by Beyries and Maxime Le Flaguais. Beyries was a shortlisted nominee for the 2017 SOCAN Songwriting Prize in the French-language division for "J'aurai cent ans".

Her second studio album, Encounter, was released on November 13, 2020.

Accolades

Discography

Studio albums
 Landing (2017)
 Encounter (2020)

Singles
 "Je pars à l'autre bout du monde" (2016)
 "Maman" (2017)
 "Au-delà des mots" (2017)
 "Si j'étais un homme" (2018)
 "Out of Touch" (2020)
 "Over Me" (2020)
 "Valhalla Dancer" (2021)

References

External links
 Official website
 Beyries on Facebook
 Beyries on Twitter

Canadian pop singers
Canadian songwriters
Canadian pop pianists
Musicians from Montreal
Songwriters from Quebec
Writers from Montreal
French-language singers of Canada
Living people
21st-century Canadian women singers
21st-century Canadian pianists
1979 births
21st-century women pianists